Sangdang-gu is a non-autonomous district in the city of Cheongju in North Chungcheong Province, South Korea. Sangdang-gu was re-established from a part of Sangdang-gu and a part of Cheongwon-gun in July 2014. The newly created Cheongwon-gu annexed the part of Sangdang-gu.

Archaeology
The Hungsu Child was found in the Turubong limestone cave located in Munui-myeon.

Administrative divisions 
Sangdang-gu is divided into 5 townships (myeon) and 8 neighborhoods (dong).

References

External links 
  

Districts of Cheongju
1995 establishments in South Korea
States and territories established in 1995